Ivan Komarov may refer to:

 Ivan Komarov (fencer) (1921–2005), Soviet fencer
 Ivan Komarov (footballer) (born 2003), Russian football player